Nygmia is a genus of tussock moths in the family Erebidae. The genus was erected by Jacob Hübner in 1820.

Species
Nygmia aeruginosa (Collenette, 1932) New Guinea
Nygmia amplior (Collenette, 1930) Sumatra, Borneo
Nygmia araucaria (Collenette, 1955) New Guinea
Nygmia aroa (Bethune-Baker, 1904) New Guinea
Nygmia arrogans (Lucas, 1900) Australia
Nygmia atereta (Collenette, 1932) Sundaland
Nygmia atrisignata (Swinhoe, 1903) Sundaland
Nygmia barbara (Swinhoe, 1903) Borneo
Nygmia baueri (Schintlmeister, 1994) Peninsular Malaysia, Sumatra, Borneo
Nygmia castor (Collenette, 1949) Java, Borneo
Nygmia chirunda (Swinhoe, 1903) Borneo, Sumatra, Malaysia
Nygmia civitta (Swinhoe, 1903) Borneo, Peninsular Malaysia, Sumatra
Nygmia corbetti Tams, 1928 Peninsular Malaysia, Sumatra
Nygmia dirtea (Swinhoe, 1905) Borneo
Nygmia discophora (Snellen, 1879) Sulawesi
Nygmia epirotica (Collenette, 1932) Peninsular Malaysia, Sumatra
Nygmia exitela (Collenette, 1949) Java, Sumatra, Borneo
Nygmia fumosa (Snellen, 1877) Sundaland
Nygmia funeralis (Swinhoe, 1903) Sundaland
Nygmia guttistriga (Walker, 1862) Borneo, Natuna Islands, Sumatra
Nygmia guttulata (Snellen, 1886) Sundaland
Nygmia habrostola (Turner, 1902) Australia
Nygmia helladia (Stoll, [1782]) Japan
Nygmia icilia (Stoll, [1790]) Sri Lanka, India
Nygmia javana (Aurivillius, 1894) Sundaland
Nygmia javanoides Holloway, 1999 Borneo, Sumatra
Nygmia lali (Schintlmeister, 1994) Sumatra, Borneo
Nygmia longitegumen Holloway, 1999 Borneo
Nygmia lunifera (Walker, 1865) Sulawesi
Nygmia mignon (Schintlmeister, 1994) Sumatra
Nygmia moalata (Swinhoe, 1916) Borneo, Peninsular Malaysia, Sumatra
Nygmia nova (Schintlmeister, 1994) Sumatra, Peninsular Malaysia, Borneo
Nygmia ochreata (Walker, 1865) Ambon
Nygmia oonophora (Collenette, 1938) Sumatra, Borneo, Peninsular Malaysia
Nygmia panselena (Collenette, 1931) New Guinea
Nygmia pelopicta (Collenette, 1932) Peninsular Malaysia
Nygmia peperites (Collenette, 1932) Peninsular Malaysia, Sumatra, Borneo
Nygmia plana (Walker, 1856) India
Nygmia poppaea (Collenette, 1953) Borneo, Peninsular Malaysia, Sumatra
Nygmia postgrisea (Rothschild, 1920) Sundaland
Nygmia protea (Collenette, 1932) Peninsular Malaysia
Nygmia puli (Schintlmeister, 1994) Sumatra, Peninsular Malaysia, Borneo
Nygmia punctatofasciata (van Eecke, 1928) Sumatra
Nygmia rubida (Bethune-Baker, 1910) New Guinea
Nygmia rubroradiata (Bethune-Baker, 1904) New Guinea
Nygmia semifumosa (Holloway, 1976) Borneo
Nygmia sinuinigra (Holloway, 1976) Borneo
Nygmia solitaria (van Eecke, 1928) Sumatra, Peninsular Malaysia, Borneo
Nygmia sublutea (Bethune-Baker, 1904) New Guinea
Nygmia talesea (Collenette, 1932)
Nygmia tamsi (Collenette, 1932) Peninsular Malaysia, Sumatra
Nygmia tigris Holloway, 1999 Borneo
Nygmia venata (Collenette, 1953) Sumatra, Borneo
Nygmia xanthomela (Walker, 1862) Borneo, Peninsular Malaysia
Nygmia zeboe (Moore, 1859) Java

References

Lymantriinae
Noctuoidea genera